Lycée Jules Verne is a senior high school in Cergy, Val-d'Oise, France, in the Paris metropolitan area.

It is located within the  area.

 it has more than 1,190 students.

References

External links
 Lycée Jules Verne 

Lycées in Val-d'Oise
Lycées in Cergy-Pontoise